Muncheon Gong clan was one of the Korean clans. Their Bon-gwan was in Munchon, South Hamgyong Province. According to the research in 2000, the number of Muncheon Gong clan was 686. Gong Yun bo, a descendant of Gong Ha su who was a pupil of Confucius, was one of the Jinshi in Tang dynasty. He was naturalized in Silla in 755 in order to avoid the conflicts named An Lushan Rebellion in Tang dynasty during Emperor Xuanzong of Tang’s reign. He was a descendant of Gong Yun bo and was banished to Muncheon in Joseon period during Sejong the Great’s reign.

See also 
 Korean clan names of foreign origin
 Gimpo Gong clan

References

External links 
 

 
Korean clan names of Chinese origin